64 km is a rural locality (a passing loop) in Shishinskoye Rural Settlement of Topkinsky District, Russia. The population was 12 as of 2010.

Streets 
 Lineinaya

Geography 
64 km is located 51 km northwest of Topki (the district's administrative centre) by road. Listvyanka is the nearest rural locality.

References 

Rural localities in Kemerovo Oblast